Carlmuesebeckius is a genus of braconid wasps in the family Braconidae. There is at least one described species in Carlmuesebeckius, C. smithsonian, found in Madagascar.

References

	

Microgastrinae